Marc Karam (born August 28, 1980) is a Canadian professional poker player. In addition to playing in major international poker tournaments he makes his living playing online poker at various stakes against a wide range of opponents.

Early life
Karam was born in Montreal, Quebec, Canada to Lebanese parents. In 1982, when he was two years old, he and his family moved to Lebanon for a year before returning to Canada to settle in Ottawa, Ontario. Karam attended McMaster Catholic elementary school and earned his high school diploma from St. Patrick’s High School in Ottawa. He then went on to study Glazier & Metal Mechanics at the Ontario Industrial & Finishing Skills Centre while working as an apprentice for a window and framing company, Transit Glass & Aluminum. After his schooling was complete, he began working full-time at Transit Glass & Aluminum. He also took on additional work as a self-taught, freelance, web designer.

Poker career
Late in the year 2001, Karam began playing micro-stakes home games and small local tournaments. Eventually, he deposited some money online and started to build a poker bankroll. He was an avid fan of professional wrestling and his friends had nicknamed him "Myst", short for "Mysterio" after his favourite professional wrestler, Rey Mysterio Jr. So, when he began playing online he chose to play under the name, "myst".  He would deposit small amounts online and play $0.50/$1.00 no limit holdem.

Over the next 5 years, he slowly moved up in stakes and built a bankroll in excess of $100,000 (USD). In early 2006, Karam won an entry into the 2006 PokerStars Caribbean Adventure (PSCA) poker tournament by qualifying online via a "satellite" tournament. Shortly after qualifying for this event, he asked for and received a six-month sabbatical from his job at Transit Glass & Aluminum. During this same sabbatical, Karam managed to qualify for the 2006 European Poker Tour (EPT) Grand Final in Monte Carlo through another online "satellite" tournament. He placed fourth in that tournament and along the way he eliminated Dutch poker pro Marcel Lüske holding the  against Lüske's pair of eights when he caught running sevens on the turn and river, giving him a Full House with the pair of 4's on the flop (after that hand, Lüske stood up, placed his finger in his mouth and pretended to vomit). Thereafter, he quit his job and became a professional poker player.

Since becoming a professional poker player, Marc has earned over $2,000,000 (USD) in major poker tournaments all around the world.

He went on to place in the money at the 4th Annual Five Star World Poker Classic and the July 21, 2006 No Limit Holdem event at the 37th Annual World Series of Poker. He then managed to place in the top 6 at the next three major tournaments he entered; The 2006 North American Poker Championship, The 2007 Aussie Millions, and The 2007 EPT Grand Final. Karam is the only professional player to have accomplished this feat.

During the 38th Annual World Series of Poker, Karam earned over $9,000 (USD) for his 33rd-place finish in the World Championship Heads-Up No Limit Hold'em event, during which he defeated 2005 NBC National Heads-Up champion Ted Forrest.

In 2007, Karam became a regular monthly contributor to both Canadian Poker Player magazine in Canada and Card Player magazine in the United States of America.

In 2010, he entered into a sponsorship deal with online poker site, Full Tilt Poker.

References

External links
 Official site
 Canadian Poker Player interview
 Pokerlistings.com interview
 EuroPoker Magazine interview

1980 births
Canadian people of Lebanese descent
Canadian poker players
Living people
People from Montreal
Sportspeople of Lebanese descent